Henry Frederick Merrett (29 June 1886 – 13 February 1954) was an Australian rules footballer who played with St Kilda in the Victorian Football League (VFL).

Family
The son of Thomas Henry Merrett (1834-1907), and Hannah Maria Merrett (1845-1919), née Polley,  Henry Frederick Merrett was born at Allendale, Victoria on 29 June 1886.

He married Eva Ruby Williams (1889-1958) in 1907. They had two children, Bruce (b.1909), and Olga (b.1910).

Football
"H. Merrett, a tall forward and follower from Warburton", made his debut for St Kilda, against Collingwood, at Victoria Park, on 17 June 1911. He played in two more senior matches: against Melbourne, at the Junction Oval on 22 July 1911, and against Richmond, at the Punt Road Oval, on 26 August 1911.

Death
He died on 13 February 1954.

Notes

References

External links 
 Playing statistics for "Henry Merritt" (sic), from AFL Tables.
 "Henry Merritt" (sic), at AustralianFootball.com.

1886 births
1954 deaths
Australian rules footballers from Victoria (Australia)
St Kilda Football Club players